Arctia dido is a moth of the family Erebidae. It was described by M. Wagner in 1841. It is found in Algeria.

The larvae feed on Taraxacum species.

This species, along with the others of the genus Atlantarctia, was moved to Arctia as a result of phylogenetic research published by Rönkä et al. in 2016.

References

Arctiina
Moths described in 1841
Moths of Africa